Hilarographa buruana is a species of moth of the family Tortricidae. It is found in Indonesia on Buru, Ambon Island and possibly Sanguir.

The wingspan is about 12 mm. The ground colour of the forewings is orange with a slight brownish admixture, consisting of basal streaks and transverse lines. The hindwings are brown.

Etymology
The specific name refers to the type location, Buru.

References

Moths described in 2009
Hilarographini